The Vuelta a San Juan is a road cycling race held in Argentina. The race consists of only a men's competition over seven stages. From 2017 to 2019, the race had a 2.1 status, which meant that UCI World Tour teams could compete in the race. In 2020, the race was promoted to the UCI ProSeries and given a 2.Pro status.

Past winners

References

Notes

External links
 
 Results

 
Cycle races in Argentina
Recurring sporting events established in 1982
UCI America Tour
1982 establishments in Argentina